Heather Cowell (born 23 January 1996) is an English rugby union player.

A former international gymnast, Cowell was a junior world champion in tumbling in 2013 in Bulgaria, and was part of the winning team at the Senior European Champion Team Event in 2014 in Portugal. Cowell performed gymnastics at the opening ceremony of the 2014 Commonwealth Games in Glasgow. Cowell competed at international level until she was 20. After playing rugby at the University of Birmingham, Cowell joined Worcester Warriors before taking some time out of the game and returning with Harlequins Women. 

Cowell scored twice on her England XV’s debut during the 2021-22 season.  A call up to the England sevens team followed for the England Rugby Europe Series in Budapest. Cowell was selected to play for England at the 2022 Commonwealth Games in rugby sevens. She was named in the England squad for the 2022 Rugby World Cup Sevens – Women's tournament held in Cape Town, South Africa in September 2022.

Personal life
Cowell attended Chase Bridge Primary School in Twickenham and Richmond College. Her brother Cameron Cowell is a professional rugby player who has also represented England at sevens rugby.

References

 

1996 births
Living people
Female rugby union players
England women's international rugby union players
English female rugby union players